Vedi may refer to:

Vedi, is a town in the Ararat Province of Armenia
Vedi (altar), is the term for "sacrificial altar" in the Vedic religion.
Vedi (film), is a 2011 Indian Tamil action film directed by Prabhu Deva featuring Vishal and Sameera Reddy in the lead roles.